The Ogilvie Mountains collared lemming (Dicrostonyx nunatakensis) is a species of rodent in the family Cricetidae.
It is found only in Yukon Territory, Canada.
Its natural habitat is tundra.

References

Dicrostonyx
Mammals of Canada
Endemic fauna of Canada
Endemic fauna of Yukon
Mammals described in 1967
Taxonomy articles created by Polbot